The first USS Sturdy (SP-82) was a patrol boat acquired by the U.S. Navy for the task of patrolling the coastal waters of the U.S. East Coast during :World War I. Her primary task was to guard the coastal area against German submarines by tending to antisubmarine nets in New York harbor.

Sturdy (SP-82) was built in 1905 by the New York Yacht, Launch, and Engine Company, Morris Heights, New York. The motor boat was acquired by the Navy on 25 May 1917 from J. A. Nickelson of Morris Heights, and was commissioned on 25 June 1917.

During World War I, Sturdy was assigned to the 3rd Naval District and served as a net tender until placed on sale on 9 October 1919. She was struck from the Navy list on 13 January 1920 and sold on 30 March 1920.

References

Sources

Notes
Department of the Navy Naval Historical Center Online Library of Selected Images: U.S. Navy Ships: USS Sturdy (SP-82), 1917-1920. Previously the Civilian Motor Boat Sturdy (1905)
NavSource Online Section Patrol Craft Photo Archive; Sturdy (SP 82)

Patrol vessels of the United States Navy
World War I patrol vessels of the United States
Ships built in Morris Heights, Bronx
1905 ships